Star+ (stylised as ST★R+) is a video-on-demand service from The Walt Disney Company launched in Latin America on August 31, 2021. It was also announced that Star+ would produce original local content which will also be exclusively released on the platform.

Original programming

Star+ Originals

Drama

Comedy

Continuations

Docuseries

Reality

Variety

Exclusive programming

Exclusive international distribution

Drama

Comedy

Adult animation

Anime

Unscripted

Exclusive films

Exclusive international distribution

Upcoming programming

Star+ Originals

Drama

Comedy

Docuseries

Exclusive international distribution

Drama

Comedy

Unscripted

Continuations

Upcoming exclusive films

Exclusive international distribution

Notes

References

Internet-related lists
Lists of television series by network
Lists of television series by streaming service
Television lists
 
Original programming